Su Keong Siong, known as Thomas Su is a Malaysian politician and lawyer who has served as the Member of the Pahang State Legislative Assembly (MLA) for Ketari since November 2022. He served as the Member of Parliament (MP) for Kampar from May 2018 to November 2022, for Ipoh Timor from May 2013 to May 2018, Member of the Perak State Executive Council (EXCO) in the Pakatan Rakyat (PR) state administration under former Menteri Besar Mohammad Nizar Jamaluddin from March 2008 to the collapse of the PR state administration in February 2009 and Perak MLA for Pasir Pinji from March 2004 to May 2013. He is a member of Democratic Action Party (DAP), a component party of the Pakatan Harapan (PH) coalition. He is also a member of the Central Executive Committee (CEC) of the DAP.

Earlier career
A Lawyer by profession, he earned an LL.M. cum laude from University of Wolverhampton before returning to Malaysia to work for C K LEONG & CO. in Ipoh. He was admitted to the Malaysian bar in 1994.

Political career
Su first involved in politics when he contested but lost as DAP candidate in 1999 for the state seat of Malim Nawar in Perak. He however was elected to the Perak State Assembly in 2004 and again in 2008 for the constituency of Pasir Pinji in Perak. During the short Pakatan Rakyat (PR) coalition rules of Perak, he was elected as an exco member in the state government led by Menteri Besar Nizar Jamaluddin in 2008. In the 2013 election Su won the Ipoh Timor parliamentary seat and succeeded incumbent Lim Kit Siang as its MP, who contested in Gelang Patah in Johor. In the 2018 election Su contested and won the Kampar parliamentary seat instead. Su change seat again in 2022, this time for Pahang State Assembly seat Ketari, replacing incumbent Young Syefura Othman who contested the federal seat of Bentong instead. Su won the seat with a slim majority of 120 votes, defeating the Barisan Nasional and Perikatan Nasional candidates.

Controversy
In 2013, he was charged under the Peaceful Assembly Act 2012 with starting a peaceful assembly "without prior notice". Prior to a ruling on these charges, a 2014 ruling by the Court of Appeal found the law's requirement of giving ten-day prior notice before holding a peaceful assembly unconstitutional, and Su applied for the charges to be dismissed accordingly. He was ultimately given a discharge not amounting to acquittal. Without an acquittal, Su was later charged again for the same alleged offense in 2016. In 2018 the Sessions Court acquitted Su after the Attorney General's Chambers withdrew the charges. According to Human Resources Minister M. Kulasegaran, the then recently-elected Pakatan Harapan government had instructed the Attorney General to review Section 9(1) of the Peaceful Assembly Act 2012, which was the provision under which Su had been charged. Su's lead counsel Ramkarpal Singh called Su's acquittal a positive step towards abolishing that provision, which he said "curtails freedom of speech."

Election results

References 

Living people
1966 births
Year of birth uncertain
People from Perak
Malaysian politicians of Chinese descent
20th-century Malaysian lawyers
Democratic Action Party (Malaysia) politicians
Members of the Dewan Rakyat
Members of the Perak State Legislative Assembly
Perak state executive councillors
Alumni of the University of Wolverhampton
21st-century Malaysian politicians